Gaby Diana Ahrens (born 15 March 1981 in Windhoek) is a Namibian sport shooter. She competed at the 2008, 2012 and 2016 Summer Olympics in the women's trap event.

Ranked Number 1 on the African Continent for many years, Ahrens has won two African Championship Titles in 2011 and 2015 as well as several Namibian, South African and Angolan National Titles in Olympic Trap Shooting. Ahrens was awarded Namibia Sports Woman of the Year in 2010, the same year she won a Bronze Medal at the Commonwealth Games in New Delhi. At the 2012 Summer Olympics, she was the Namibian flag-bearer, the first woman of her country to receive this honor. At the 2016 Summer Olympics, she again competed in the women's trap, where she finished in 9th place, just one target off the finals.

Ahrens runs her own business in Windhoek. She retired from competitive sport in 2016. She currently serves as Vice President on the Namibia National Olympic Committee and is an Athletes Representative of the Africa National Olympic Committee Association ANOCA and of the World Anti Doping Agency WADA.
Ahrens has a master's degree in sports management through the International Olympic Committee MEMOS in Lausanne, Switzerland. Her efforts aim at supporting African elite athletes in competition and is taking steps to counter the negative influencing factors related to organizational stressors affecting athletes performance.

References

External links

1981 births
Living people
Namibian female sport shooters
Olympic shooters of Namibia
Shooters at the 2008 Summer Olympics
Shooters at the 2012 Summer Olympics
Shooters at the 2016 Summer Olympics
Shooters at the 2010 Commonwealth Games
Shooters at the 2014 Commonwealth Games
Commonwealth Games bronze medallists for Namibia
Trap and double trap shooters
Sportspeople from Windhoek
White Namibian people
Commonwealth Games medallists in shooting
20th-century Namibian women
21st-century Namibian women
Medallists at the 2010 Commonwealth Games